The Lennox is a region of Scotland centred on The Vale of Leven, including its great loch: Loch Lomond.

The Gaelic name of the river is Leamhn, meaning the smooth stream, which anglicises to Leven (as Gaelic mh is spirantised). The surrounding area is the field of the smooth stream - Leamhnachd in Gaelic; this was originally anglicised as Levenauchen / Levenachs, then softened into Levenax / Lennax, and eventually the area was known simply as Lennox.

Lennox was not one of the so-called seven ancient Provinces of Scotland, but formed as a province in the Middle Ages. The district embraced the whole of the ancient sheriffdom of Dumbarton: the parishes of Rosneath, Arrochar, Row, Luss, Cardross, Bonhill, Dumbarton, Kilmaronock, New Kilpatrick, Old Kilpatrick, Baldernock, Buchanan, Drymen, Killearn, Balfron, Fintry, and Strathblane, with Campsie and Kilsyth, being all within the bounds ruled over by the Earls of Lennox.

In 1581 James VI of Scotland granted Esmé Stewart, Earl of Lennox, the title of Duke of Lennox; the title is currently held by Charles Gordon-Lennox.

Under local government reforms in the mid 19th century, the province of Lennox was re-structured as the County of Dunbartonshire, when the north-eastern shore of Loch Lomond was transferred to Stirlingshire.

References

External links
Border Disputes: Gaelic Cultural Identity and Interaction in the Lennox and Menteith 

East Dunbartonshire
Lennoxtown
Vale of Leven
West Dunbartonshire